John Edward Gallas FEA (born 11 January 1950) is a New Zealand born poet who in 2016 was the Joint Winner of the Indigo Dreams Pamphlet Prize and the St Magnus International Festival poet.

Biography
Gallas was born in Wellington in New Zealand and is of Austrian descent, the son of Frederick, né Fritz Eduard Gänzl, an educator, and Nancy Gallas, née Agnes Ada Welsh. He is the younger brother of the historian and writer Kurt Gänzl.  He attended the University of Otago in his native New Zealand, and won a Commonwealth Scholarship to Merton College, Oxford to study Medieval English Literature and Old Icelandic and has since lived and worked in York, Liverpool and various other locations in England as a bottlewasher, archaeologist and teacher.

The Little Sublime Comedy was Gallas's tenth Carcanet Press collection. Gallas is the editor of books of translations, including 52 Euros, The Song Atlas and Rhapsodies 1931, also published by Carcanet, and the librettist for David Knotts' Toads on a Tapestry, and for Alasdair Nicolson's opera The Iris Murders. His poem 'Cat' was The Guardian'''s 'Poem of the Week' in December 2014.Poem of the Week: Cat by John Gallas - The Guardian 1 December 2014 A review of Gallas's The Extasie (2021) by Maria Crawford of The Financial Times said, "New Zealand-born, UK-based Gallas fills his 12th Carcanet collection with resounding echoes of John Donne, Thomas Wyatt and John Clare. In a series of love poems set against the patterns of the English landscape, [Gallas] applies a modern-day directness to lyrical expressions of intimacy." His translation of twenty-five poems by Amado Nervo, Poems of Faith and Doubt, was also published in 2021. Over the years he has worked with his brother Kurt Gänzl on translations of Baudelaire, Verhaeren, Materlinck, Yourcenar, Anna de Noailles, Nerval, Florian and Borel, among others.Zubair, Sarah-Jane. "Ecstatic and intoxicate", review of Rhapsodies 1831: Petrus Borel, The Times Literary Supplement, 30 September 2022

Gallas is a Fellow of the English Association, won the International Welsh Poetry Competition in 2009, was the Joint Winner of the Indigo Dreams Pamphlet Prize in 2016 and was the St Magnus Festival poet in Orkney in the same year. In November 2021 he won the Parkinson's Art Poet of the Year 2021 competition with his poem 'The Night My Great Aunt Invented The Anarchist Hop'.

List of books by GallasFlying Carpets Over Filbert Street (Carcanet)Grrrrr (Carcanet)Resistance is Futile (Carcanet)The Ballad of Robin Hood and the Deer (Agraphia Press), pictures by Clifford HarperThe Ballad of Santo Caserio (Agraphia Press), pictures by Clifford HarperThe Song Atlas (Carcanet)Star City (Carcanet)The Book with Twelve Tales (Carcanet)Fucking Poets (3 vols) (Cold Hub Press, New Zealand)40 Lies (Carcanet) pictures by Sarah KirbyFresh Air & The Story of Molecule (Carcanet)52 Euros (Carcanet)Pacifictions (Cold Hub Press, New Zealand)The Alphabet of Ugly Animals (Magpie Press)Mad John's Walk (Five Leaves : Occasional Pamphlets) January 2017The Little Sublime Comedy (Carcanet)17 Very Pacific Poems (Indigo Dreams)The Blood Book Gerolstein Press, New Zealand (2018)The Extasie (Carcanet) 2021
Amado Nervo, Poems of Faith and Doubt, SLG Publishing Oxford (2021), translatorWhere Grace Grows Ever Green: Middle English Lyrics, (SLG Oxford) 2021   The High Roof of Heaven, (SLG Oxford) 2022 
Petrus Borel: Rhapsodies 1931, translated from the French by John Gallas and Kurt Gänzl, (Carcanet Classics) 2022 17 Paper Resurrections (Dempsey & Windle) 2022The Alphabet of Ugly Animals'' (Cerasus) – forthcoming

References

External links
John Gallas Poetry - official website
Gallas on the Internet Movie Database
Welsh Poetry Competition 2009

1950 births
University of Otago alumni
Alumni of Merton College, Oxford
New Zealand male poets
New Zealand people of Austrian descent
New Zealand expatriates in the United Kingdom
Living people
Fellows of the English Association